This is a list of International Confederation of Societies of Authors and Composers or CISAC members.

As of September 2011, CISAC counts among its members 232 authors' societies in 121 countries.

Africa 

Algeria
 ONDA

Angola
 SADIA, UNAC-SA

Benin 
 BUBEDRA

Burkina Faso 
 BBDA

Cameroon 
 CMC, SOCILADRA

Central African Republic 
 BUCADA

Congo 
 BCDA

Côte d'Ivoire 
 BURIDA

Democratic Republic of Congo 
 SONECA

Egypt 
 SACERAU

Ghana 
 COSGA

Guinea
 BGDA 

Kenya
 MCSK

Madagascar
 OMDA

Malawi
 COSOMA

Mali
 BUMDA

Mauritius
 MASA

Morocco
 BMDA

Mozambique
 SOMAS

Namibia
 NASCAM

Niger
 Bureau Nigérien du Droit d'Auteur (BNDA)

Nigeria
 COSON, MCSN

Senegal
 BSDA

Seychelles
 SACS

South Africa
 DALRO, Southern African Music Rights Organisation (SAMRO), SARRAL

Togo
 BUTODRA

Tunisia
 OTPDA

Uganda
 Uganda Performing Right Society

United Republic of Tanzania
 COSOTA

Zambia
 ZAMCOPS

Zimbabwe
 ZIMURA

America 

Argentina 
 ARGENTORES, DAC, SADAIC, SAVA 

Barbados 
 COSCAP

Belize 
 BSCAP

Bolivia 
 SOBODAYCOM

Brazil 
 ABRAMUS, ADDAF, AMAR, ASSIM, AUTVIS, SADEMBRA, SBACEM, SBAT, SICAM, SOCINPRO, UBC

Canada 
 Access Copyright, CARCC, CMRRA, CSCS, DRCC, SARTEC, SOCAN, SODRAC, SPACQ

Chile 
 ATN, CREAIMAGEN, SCD

Colombia 
 SAYCO

Costa Rica 
 ACAM

Cuba 
 ACDAM, ADAVIS

Dominican Republic 
 SGACEDOM

Ecuador 
 ARTEGESTION, SAYCE

El Salvador 
 SACIM, EGC

Guatemala 
 AEI

Honduras 
 AACIMH

Jamaica
 JACAP

Mexico
 DIRECTORES, SACM, SOGEM, SOMAAP

Nicaragua
 NICAUTOR

Panama
 SPAC

Paraguay
 APA

Peru
 APDAYC, APSAV

Saint Lucia
 ECCO

Suriname
 SASUR

Trinidad and Tobago
 CCL, COTT

United States
 AMRA, ARS, ASCAP, Broadcast Music Incorporated (BMI), Directors Guild of America (DGA), National Music Publishers Association (NMPA), SESAC Inc., The Author's Registry Inc., VAGA, Writers Guild of America (WGA)

Uruguay
 AGADU, LATINAUTOR

Venezuela
 AUTORARTE, SACVEN

Asia & Oceania 

Armenia  
 ARMAUTHOR 

Australia 
 AMCOS (Associate), APRA (Member), ASDACS, AWGACS, Copyright Agency
Azerbaijan
 AAS

Brunei Darussalam 
 BEAT

China 
 MCSC

Georgia 
 SAS

Hong Kong 
 CASH

India 
 IPRS

Indonesia 
 WAMI, KCI, PAPPRI

Israel 
 ACUM, TALI

Japan
 APG-Japan, JASRAC, JASPAR

Kazakhstan
 KazAK

Kyrgyzstan
 KYRGYZPATENT

Macau
 MACA

Malaysia
 MACP

Mongolia
 MOSCAP

Nepal
 CPSN, MRCSN

Pakistan
 COMP
Philippines
 FILSCAP

Republic of Korea
 KOMCA, KOSA, SACK

Singapore
 COMPASS

Taiwan, Chinese Taipei
 COLCCMA, MÜST

Thailand
 MCT

Turkey
 MESAM, MSG, SETEM, SINEBIR

Uzbekistan
 GAI UZ

Vietnam
 VCPMC

Europe 

Albania 
 ALBAUTOR

Austria 
 AKM, AUSTRO-MECHANA, LITERAR-MECHANA, VBK, VDFS

Belarus 
 NCIP

Belgium 
 GESAC, SABAM, SOFAM

Bosnia and Herzegovina 
 SQN

Bulgaria 
 FILMAUTOR, MUSICAUTOR, TEATERAUTOR

Croatia
 HDS-ZAMP

Czech Republic 
 DILIA, GESTOR, OSA

Denmark 
 COPY-DAN BILLEDKUNST, KODA, NCB

Estonia 
 EAU

Finland 
 KIRJAILIJA, KOPIOSTO, KUVASTO, TEOSTO

France 
 ADAGP, SACD, SACEM, SACENC, SCAM, SESAM, SGDL, SNAC, SPACEM

Germany 
 BILD-KUNST, GEMA

Greece 
  Autodia, Aepi, SADH, SOPE

Holy See (Vatican City State) 
 UFFICIO LEGALE

Hungary 
 ARTISJUS, FILMJUS, HUNGART

Iceland 
 STEF

Ireland 
 IMRO, IVARO, SDCSI

Italy 
 SIAE

Latvia
 AKKA-LAA

Lithuania
 LATGA

Luxembourg
 SACEMLUXEMBOURG

Montenegro
 PAM CG

Netherlands
 BUMA, LIRA, PICTORIGHT, STEMRA, VEVAM

Norway
 BONO, TONO

Poland
 Society of Authors ZAiKS, ZAPA

Portugal
 SPA

Republic of Moldova
 AsDAC

Romania
 UCMR-ADA

Russian Federation
 RAO, UPRAVIS

Serbia
 SOKOJ

Slovakia
 LITA, SOZA

Slovenia
 SAZAS, ZAMP Association of Slovenia

Spain
 DAMA, SGAE, VEGAP

Sweden
 BUS, STIM

Switzerland
 PROLITTERIS, SSA, SUISA, SUISSIMAGE

The Republic of Macedonia
 ZAMP - Macedonia

Ukraine
 UACRR

United Kingdom
 ACS, ALCS, Design and Artists Copyright Society (DACS), DIRECTORS UK, Mechanical-Copyright Protection Society (MCPS), Performing Right Society (PRS FOR MUSIC)

References

Music-related lists
International music organizations